Craig Stanton Serjeant (born 1 November 1951) is a former Australian cricketer who played in 12 Test matches and three One Day Internationals in 1977 and 1978.

Career

First Class Debut
Serjeant made his first class debut in 1976–77 for Western Australia. He enjoyed a successful season, scoring 730 runs at an average of 66.36, including 89 against New South Wales, 82 against Pakistan, 54 against Victoria, 140 against Queensland and 101 against the touring MCC.

This run of strong scores, particularly against two touring sides, saw him selected in the Australian squad for the 1977 Ashes. He was one of a number of young batsmen in the squad, others including Kim Hughes and David Hookes. Australia only took two specialist openers, Rick McCosker and Ian Davis, and it was thought Serjeant could be a back up.

1977 Ashes
Australia's batting line up in the Test immediately prior to the tour had been Rick McCosker, Ian Davis, Gary Cosier, Greg Chappell, David Hookes and Doug Walters. Poor early tour form from Cosier and Davis saw opportunities open up in the Test team for Sergeant, who was one of the better performing batsmen, with scores of 65 at Arundel, 55 against Kent and Surrey, 50 against Somerset and 59 against Essex. Many of these runs were scored with Sergeant opening. Serjeant expressed a desire to bat down the order but Greg Chappell said "he has no say in the matter".

Australia's Test preparations were thrown by the news of the World Series Cricket plans. Serjeant was one of only four players in the Australian squad who had not signed.

Serjeant was picked to play in two of the One-Day Internationals.

Test Debut
Serjeant was selected to play in the first Test at Lord's, batting at four (Richie Robinson was picked to open.) Serjeant top scored in Australia's first innings with 81 but failed in the second in a match that ended in a draw.

Serjeant's good form continued with 159 against Nottinghamshire, in one of Australia's few victories on the tour and 55 against Yorkshire. He revealed he had been offered a place in World Series Cricket but declined.

Serjeant failed twice in the second Test then endured a run of poor form in the tour games. He was overlooked for the third and fourth Tests.

During the tour Serjeant received an offer to play in Queensland but turned it down.

Serjeant was recalled to the team for the fifth Test, where he replaced Ian Davis as opener. He scored a duck.

1977–78 vs India
Although Serjeant was not one of the initial players offered a contract to play World Series Cricket, his success in England saw an attempt to recruit him. Serjeant turned down the offer as he wanted to play establishment cricket.

Serjeant enjoyed good domestic form at the beginning of the 1977–78 summer, scoring 129 against New South Wales, 140 against Queensland and 63 against South Australia.

He was not only selected in Australia's team for the first Test, but also appointed vice captain under Bob Simpson. He scored a pair in the first Test failed twice against India for WA, then failed twice again in the second Test.

Serjeant managed to keep his position for the next two Tests. In the third he made 85, which he later described as his best innings. However he failed in the second innings, and in both digs in the 4th Test.

He was dropped for the final Test of the series, but was kept on for the tour to the West Indies.

1977–78 West Indies Tour
In the West Indies Serjeant scored 63 in his first tour game but a duck in the second. This meant he was initially not picked in the first Test team but a last minute illness to Rick Darling saw him open – he scored 3 and 40. Serjeant then made 114 against Barbados but failed twice in the second test.

Serjeant kept his place in the third Test. He made a duck in the first innings but scored 124 in the second, helping lead Australia to a famous victory.

In the fourth Test Serjeant made 49 and 4 then 26 and 32 not out in the fifth.

Later career
Serjeant struggled early during the 1978–79 season and was unable to regain his place in the Australian team. However, he performed solidly for Western Australia for the next few seasons. He was appointed vice captain at the beginning of the 1981–82 season.

Post-cricket career
Serjeant graduated from Curtin University with a degree in science in 1972 and worked as a chemist at SCGH for 12 years. He then became a financial planner, working under former Australian bowler Sam Gannon from 1988 onwards.

References

External links
 

1951 births
Living people
Australia Test cricketers
Australia One Day International cricketers
Western Australia cricketers
People educated at Trinity College, Perth
Australian cricketers
Cricketers from Perth, Western Australia
Sportsmen from Western Australia